1. FC Eschborn was a German association football club which played in Eschborn, a town close to Frankfurt, Hesse.

History
The association was founded 10 September 1930 and after World War II was re-established as SG Eschborn. In 1950, the football department left behind the postwar sports club, which was by then known as Turnverein Eschborn, to become an independent club under its current name.

A perennial lower division amateur side, 1. FC made strides that have seen it playing in the Regionalliga Süd (III) as recently as the 2005–06 season. Their success was mixed, however: while making some strong showings in the fourth division Oberliga Hessen, they were not able to compete effectively at the Regionalliga level. The club was also suffering financially, and unable to find a strong sponsor, faced bankruptcy from which it never recovered.

Eschborn took part in the 2005–06 German Cup tournament on the strength of their championship in the Oberliga Hessen (IV) the previous season, but were eliminated in the opening round by 1. FC Nürnberg.

The club returned to the Hessenliga (V) again after spending the 2007–08 season in the Landesliga. It won the league in 2011–12 and thereby earned promotion to the new Regionalliga Südwest. At this level it lasted for only one season before being relegated back to the Hessenliga. At the end of the 2015–16 Eschborn withdrew from the Hesenliga and competitive football after declaring insolvency and ceased to exist.

Honours
The club's honours:

League
 Hessenliga
 Champions: 2003, 2005, 2012
 Landesliga Hessen-Mitte
 Runners-up: 2000, 2001, 2008

Cup
 Hesse Cup
 Runners-up: 2005

Recent managers
Recent managers of the club:

Recent seasons
The recent season-by-season performance of the club:

 With the introduction of the Regionalligas in 1994 and the 3. Liga in 2008 as the new third tier, below the 2. Bundesliga, all leagues below dropped one tier. Also in 2008, a large number of football leagues in Hesse were renamed, with the Oberliga Hessen becoming the Hessenliga, the Landesliga becoming the Verbandsliga, the Bezirksoberliga becoming the Gruppenliga and the Bezirksliga becoming the Kreisoberliga. In 2012, the number of Regionalligas was increased from three to five with all Regionalliga Süd clubs except the Bavarian ones entering the new Regionalliga Südwest.

References

External links
 1. FC Eschborn at Weltfussball.de 
 Das deutsche Fußball-Archiv  historical German domestic league tables

Defunct football clubs in Germany
Defunct football clubs in Hesse
Association football clubs established in 1930
1930 establishments in Germany
Association football clubs disestablished in 2016
2016 disestablishments in Germany
Football clubs in Germany